RPN NewsWatch is a Philippine flagship television news program that aired on Radio Philippines Network (RPN) from June 1, 1970 until October 29, 2012. It was the longest-running English-language newscast of RPN. The program had a complicated history, undergoing several name changes until it was cancelled in 2012.

Its reportorial teams were tasked to gather news from every major beat in the Greater Manila Area as well as nearby provinces.

Broadcast chronology
Launched on June 1, 1970, it became one of the highly watched English newscasts on Philippine TV alongside The World Tonight of ABS-CBN and The Big News of ABC 5 (now TV5). It is dubbed as the "First TV Newspaper" in the Philippines. Prior to 2008, it produced some spin-offs and like:
 RPN NewsWatch Balita Ngayon, a Filipino-language early evening newscast.
 RPN NewsWatch sa Umaga, morning spin-off of the newscast.
 RPN NewsWatch sa Tanghali, noontime spin-off of the newscast.
 RPN NewsWatch Kids Edition, first youth spin-off of the newscast that aired from 1979 to 1993.
 RPN NewsWatch Evening Cast, first English-language early evening newscast anchored by Cathy Santillan, then it was anchored by Cielo Villaluna, Rolly Lakay Gonzalo and Cristina Pecson; later with Buddy Lopa. It was also the first newscast from 1970 to 1999. From 1999 to 2000, it was named as RPN NewsWatch Primetime Edition.
 RPN NewsWatch Prime Cast, a late night edition also anchored by Harry Gasser, Cathy Santillan, Dodi Lacuna, Lulu Pascual, Mike Toledo and Coco Quisumbing and later Eric Eloriaga (Eloriaga, who is known for his very strong American English accent, also anchored rival newscast The Big News on ABC 5).
 RPN NewsWatch Now, replacement of Primetime Balita aired from August 13, 2001 to March 9, 2007.
 RPN Jr. NewsWatch, second youth spin-off that aired in 2005.
 RPN Aksyon Balita, later NewsWatch Aksyon Balita, successor of NewsWatch from April 17, 2006 to January 4, 2008, first anchored by Erwin Tulfo, Connie Sison, Aljo Bendijo, Jake Morales, Vikki Sambilay and Bobby Yan.
 RPN i-Watch News, replacement of NewsWatch Now anchored by former 103.5 K-Lite disc jockey Carlo Tirona, and Aryana Lim, who was replaced by Lexi Schulze after a few months. It aired from March 12, 2007 to January 11, 2008.

On July 3, 2000, NewsWatch made its one-year absence on television due to low ratings because of the premiere of the network's only Filipino-language late-afternoon newscasts RPN Arangkada Xtra Balita and late-night newscast Primetime Balita. It was during that time, that some television networks start airing late-night newscasts in Filipino-language from the last year of the 20th century. But Primetime Balita was replaced by RPN NewsWatch Now and returning its English-language news reporting on August 13, 2001, until its final broadcast on March 9, 2007. On January 7, 2008, when Solar Entertainment channel C/S started to air on free-TV, it went back on the air replacing RPN NewsWatch Aksyon Balita. It was anchored by the network's president and Chief Executive Officer, former Defense secretary and senator Orly Mercado and the News and Public Affairs department head Marigold Haber-Dunca. Because of Mercado's advocacy on being an environmentalist, the background are all adorned with plants On January 14, 2008, its late-night spin-off was aired as RPN NewsWatch Second Edition. This broadcast was anchored by Jay Esteban and Queen Sebastian. It also started to air on cable on all frequencies occupying C/S. The network's hourly news updates was renamed as NewsWatch Update until February 25, 2011.

The show was reformatted into a reality show between June 7, 2008, and August 16, 2008. On October 11, 2008, another version was premiered, entitled RPN NewsWatch Junior Edition with the contestants of the show anchoring it. This was the third youth spin-off of the RPN NewsWatch; the previous two were RPN NewsWatch Kids Edition (1979 to 1993) and RPN Jr. NewsWatch (2005).

On October 8, 2008, broadcasts covering of the games of the Philippine Basketball Association (PBA) was started. These were broadcast to coincide with the second half of the game on Wednesday and Friday. This coverage had ended since 2011 when RPN lost its PBA broadcasting rights to Studio 23 (and later to TV5).

On February 16, 2009, former ABS-CBN news anchor and beauty queen Joyce Burton-Titular replaced Orly Mercado as anchor. Mercado was then able to focus on his duties as the network's president and CEO.

On November 30, 2009, Radio Philippines Network (RPN) relaunched as Solar TV. Broadcast times were changed from 30 minutes to 60 minutes duration. From the usual twice a day times of 5:30 pm and 11:00 pm, it became once a day at 5:30 pm and Reema Chanco was engaged as an additional anchor. RPN NewsCap replaced RPN NewsWatch Second Edition and started airing at midnight. In 2010, the timeslot was moved to 11:30 in the evening. It also continued to air on both free TV and on cable until February 25, 2011.

On March 2, 2011, after Solar Entertainment bought 34% stake in RPN, RPN relaunched as ETC. Alongside RPN NewsCap, RPN NewsWatch started to air only on free TV on that date at 5 pm as ETC had occupied the RPN frequency on all cable providers nationwide. But, it is still being managed to air only through Global Destiny Cable (now Destiny Cable, owned by SkyCable) on channel 116, which was the frequency occupied by The Game Channel, a channel of Solar TV Network, occupying the 5:00 pm timeslot. On August 15, 2011, the two newscasts began to air on BEAM TV Channel 31 as The Game Channel was simulcast on that channel. Its simulcast on that channel stopped in October 2011.

On October 29, 2012, after 42 years on the airwaves, RPN NewsWatch and RPN NewsCap were axed due to the impending privatization of the network and the controversial retrenchment of some employees of the network. However, RPN NewsWatch is still used by RPN's provincial AM radio arm Radyo Ronda for its newscasts.

Past anchors

Past news reporters

See also
 Solar Network News
 RPN iWatch News
 RPN NewsCap
 RPN News Update
 RPN News and Public Affairs
 List of programs previously broadcast by Radio Philippines Network

References

1970s Philippine television series
1980s Philippine television series
1990s Philippine television series
2000s Philippine television series
1970 Philippine television series debuts
2012 Philippine television series endings
English-language television shows
Philippine television news shows
Radio Philippines Network news shows
RPN News and Public Affairs shows
Flagship evening news shows
Children's news shows